is a 2017 Japanese film directed by Yuki Kobayashi. The film is based on the Ōmuta murders.

Plot
4 members of a family are in debt and struggle financially. They plan to rob a wealthy family who runs a loan shark operation. Due to a reckless plan, they kill one person in the wealthy family. The family goes on to commit more crimes and kill more people.

Cast
Shotaro Mamiya as Takanori (Tetsuji's son, local gangster)
Naomasa Musaka as Tetsuji (Yakuza boss)
Katsuya Maiguma as Takashi (Tetsuji's son, Takanori's big brother)
Kanako Irie as Naomi (Tetsuji's wife)
Haduki Shimizu as Kaori (Takanori's lover)
Motoki Ochiai as Katsuyuki (Yoshida's son)
Kisetsu Fujiwara as Shoji (Yoshida's son)
Miyuki Torii as Patra / Ms.Yoshida (Loan shark)

References

External links
  

Films based on Japanese novels
2010s Japanese films